A red diaper baby is a child of parents who were members of the United States Communist Party (CPUSA) or were close to the party or sympathetic to its aims.

History
In their book Red Diapers: Growing Up in the Communist Left, Judy Kaplan and Linn Shapiro define red diaper babies as "children of CPUSA members, children of former CPUSA members, and children whose parents never became members of the CPUSA but were involved in political, cultural, or educational activities led or supported by the Party".

More generally, the phrase is sometimes used to refer to a child of any radical parent, regardless of that parent's past partisan affiliation (or the affiliation of the child). Red Diaper Baby is also the title of an autobiographical one man show and book by monologist Josh Kornbluth, and a 2004 documentary film by Doug Pray.

References

Further reading
 
 
 
 
 
 
 
 
 
 
 

Communist terminology
Communist Party USA